The 2012 FINA Diving World Cup took place in London, United Kingdom, from Monday February 20, 2012 to Sunday February 26, 2012.

The 2012 Fina World Diving Cup was the first event for the London Aquatics Centre,a test event part of the London Prepares series of test events and also served as a qualifying event for nations to attend the 2012 Olympic Games.

Medal summary

Medal table

Men's events

Women's events

External links 
 FINA Diving World Cup 2012

 
International sports competitions in London
Fina Diving World Cup
Fina Diving World Cup
Fina Diving World Cup
FINA Diving World Cup
Fina Diving World Cup
Diving competitions in the United Kingdom
International aquatics competitions hosted by the United Kingdom